East Branch is a hamlet in Delaware County, New York, United States. East Branch has a post office with the ZIP Code 13756.

References

Hamlets in Delaware County, New York
Hamlets in New York (state)